Austria competed at the 1976 Summer Olympics in Montreal, Quebec, Canada. 60 competitors, 54 men and 6 women, took part in 44 events in 15 sports.

Medalists

Archery

In its first appearance in the archery competition at the Olympics, Austria entered one man.

Men's Individual Competition:
 Oswald Probts — 2173 points (→ 33rd place)

Athletics

Men's Decathlon
 Georg Werthner
 Final — 7443 points (→ 16th place)

Boxing

Canoeing

Cycling

Six cyclists represented Austria in 1976.

Individual road race
 Herbert Spindler — 4:49:01 (→ 18th place) 
 Roman Humenberger — 4:49:01 (→ 21st place) 
 Wolfgang Steinmayr — 4:49:01 (→ 27th place) 
 Rudolf Mitteregger — 5:00:19 (→ 51st place)

Team time trial
 Leo Karner
 Roman Humenberger
 Rudolf Mitteregger
 Johann Summer

Diving

Equestrian

Fencing

Five fencers, all men, represented Austria in 1976.

Men's épée
 Karl-Heinz Müller
 Peter Zobl-Wessely
 Herbert Lindner

Men's team épée
 Herbert Lindner, Karl-Heinz Müller, Herbert Polzhuber, Peter Zobl-Wessely

Men's sabre
 Hanns Brandstätter

Judo

Rowing

Sailing

Open

Shooting

Open

Swimming

Weightlifting

Wrestling

References

Nations at the 1976 Summer Olympics
1976 Summer Olympics
Summer Olympics